The blue ribbon is a symbol of high quality. The association comes from The Blue Riband, a prize awarded for the fastest crossing of the Atlantic Ocean by passenger liners and, prior to that from Cordon Bleu, which referred to the blue ribbon worn by the French knightly Order of the Holy Spirit.
The spelling blue riband is still encountered in most English-speaking countries, but in the United States, the term was altered to blue ribbon, and ribbons of this color came to be awarded for first place in certain athletic or other competitive endeavours (such as county and state fairs). It also may be applied to distinguished members of a group or commission who have convened to address a situation or problem; the usual usage is "blue ribbon commission" or "blue-ribbon panel".

Fair competitions

In some fair competitions in the U.S., particularly 4-H and FFA livestock and horticultural events, blue ribbons may be awarded to any project or exhibit which meets or exceeds all of a competition's judging criteria. In Canada, New Zealand and Great Britain, blue ribbons are awarded to second place, with red ribbons awarded to first.

The project may not necessarily be the first-place finisher, however. In such cases, a purple ribbon may be given to the champion and second-place (or reserve) champion.

Usage as an awareness or activism ribbon
Blue ribbons have been used as awareness ribbons for numerous different causes. Notable examples:

 The "Blue Ribbon Online Free Speech Campaign" is an online campaign by the EFF endorsing the protection of free speech on the Internet.
 The blue ribbon is internationally used to spread awareness of chronic fatigue syndrome
 A blue ribbon is also the ribbon used for awareness for the autoimmune disease of Sjögren's syndrome.
 In Canada, it is the symbol of an anti-tobacco, anti–second hand smoke campaign. It has the same meaning in Japan. Students of the Hugh Boyd Secondary School in Richmond, British Columbia started the "Blue Ribbon Campaign" in 1999. Each year it has grown and now has taken on a national scope. Singapore is the first country in the region to adopt The Blue Ribbon initiative started by the World Health Organisation Western Pacific Region, on a nationwide scale with 10 markets and food centres.
 In Spain, a blue ribbon (lazo azul) was used since 1993 by those opposing the terrorism of ETA.
 During the political battle in Israel over the disengagement from the Gaza Strip, blue ribbons indicated support for the disengagement, while orange ribbons indicated opposition.
 In Japan, a blue ribbon is a symbol against abduction by North Korea. It symbolizes the Sea of Japan, between Japan and Korea.
 In the Philippines, the Senate has a Blue Ribbon Committee which serves as an oversight to government accountability and conducts investigations against corrupt officials.
 In spring 2007, thousands of World Bank employees started wearing blue ribbons as a symbol of support for the cause of good governance. This was seen as a silent protest against World Bank President Paul Wolfowitz, who had to step down several weeks later due to charges of nepotism.
 In Sweden there is a temperance organization with the name "Blå bandet" (The Blue Ribbon).
 In the United States, blue ribbons are also symbols for several disorders. The blue ribbon (and awareness bracelet from CCFA) are used to signify Crohn's disease, ulcerative colitis, and associated gastrointestinal diseases.  A light blue ribbon is the symbol of prostate cancer awareness, a royal blue ribbon is the symbol of mesothelioma awareness, and a dark blue ribbon is the symbol of colorectal cancer (colon cancer and rectal cancer) awareness. Blue is also used in the multi-colored ribbons symbolizing awareness of bladder cancer and thyroid cancer. Shaped like the letter "P", it is an American symbol for Parkinson's disease. 
 Against child abuse. The National Exchange Club’s national project, the Prevention of Child Abuse, was adopted in 1979 with the encouragement of National President Dr. Edward North, Jr., a physician from Jackson, Mississippi, who observed increased incidences of abuse through his medical practice. The blue ribbon became the emblem of the project following the example of Bonnie Finney. The club sponsors numerous Blue Ribbon Campaigns and Child Abuse Prevention Month in April. In the wake of the Penn State child sex abuse scandal, the Penn State Nittany Lions football team announced that they will wear a blue ribbon to support child abuse victims. 
 The blue ribbon in Hong Kong represents support of the Hong Kong police, in opposition to the yellow ribbon, which represents the Umbrella movement since the 2014 Hong Kong protests.

Other uses
 The Norwegian Cancer Society (NCS) has a blue ribbon campaign each November, in order to raise awareness about prostate cancer. 
 The Electronic Frontier Foundation has a blue ribbon campaign for free speech.
 Blue ribbons for boys (and pink for girls) were used from the mid-19th century on christening gowns in Paris, and to a limited extent in the United States. In St. Petersburg (Russia) ribbons of the same color scheme were used on white funeral shrouds for children.
In Australia and New Zealand, safe seats are sometimes described as "blue-ribbon seats". As blue is associated with the right-wing Liberal Party of Australia, safe Labor seats are sometimes called "red-ribbon seats".
 Since the 2014 Hong Kong Protests and 2019 Hong Kong Protests, blue ribbons were used as a symbol for people supporting Hong Kong Police, pro-government parties, Hong Kong government and Chinese government.

Companies and products
 The Italian Peroni Brewery has a beer "Nastro Azzurro" referring to the Blue Riband held by the Italian SS Rex from 1933 to 1935.
 Beginning in the 1940s, Warner Bros., in a cost-conserving effort, began to reissue its backlog of color cartoons under a new program which they called Merrie Melodies "Blue Ribbon" reissues. For the reissue, the original front-and-end title sequences were altered.
 Blue Ribbon Barbecue is a chain of two restaurants and a catering service in the Boston suburbs.
 Pabst Blue Ribbon Beer, which got its name from originally having a blue ribbon tied around the neck of the bottle (between 1882 and 1916).
 Blue Ribbon is a brand of ice cream sold in Australia and owned by Unilever.
 Blue Ribbon Dive Resort is a 5 Star PADI dive resort in Mabini, Anilao in  the Philippines

See also
 Blue Riband (disambiguation) for other uses of the term Blue Riband
 Blue Ribbon Awards
 Blue Ribbon Schools Program
 Medals of Honor (Japan)

References

External links 
 

Awareness ribbon
Ribbon, blue